Krzysztof Stanisław Mróz (born 8 May 1977) is a Polish politician. He was elected to the Senate of Poland (10th term) representing the constituency of Legnica. He was also elected to the 9th term of the Senate of Poland.

References 

Living people
1977 births
Place of birth missing (living people)
Law and Justice politicians
20th-century Polish politicians
21st-century Polish politicians
Members of the Senate of Poland 2015–2019
Members of the Senate of Poland 2019–2023